The Pax Christi International Peace Award is given out every year since 1988 by the Christian peace organisation Pax Christi to other peace organisations and peace activists. The focus lies on grassroots activists and organisations that are active in an ongoing conflict, working against violence and injustice. It is considered one of the most important peace awards awarded by international non-governmental organizations.

The award is funded by the Cardinal Bernardus Alfrink Peace Fund and the board of the organisation Pax Christi International decides the winners. The annual award recipients usually get media attention in Catholic news outlets worldwide.

Recipients 

 1988: Margarida Maria Alves (Confederação Nacional dos Trabalhadores na Agricultura), Brazil
 1989: Luis Pérez Aguirre, Uruguay
 1990: Dana Nemcova, Czech Republic
 1991: Osservatorio Meridionale, Italy
 1992: Joaquim Pinto de Andrade, Angola
 1993: Ray Williams and Dorraine Booth-Williams, USA
 1994: José Mpundu E'Booto, Democratic Republic of the Congo
 1995: Janina Ochojska, Poland
 1996: Franjo Komarica, Hadzi Haillovic, Jelena Santic and Gordana Stojanovic, Croatia, Bosnia and Herzegovina, Serbia
 1997: Domingos Soares and Maria de Lourdes Martins Cruz, East Timor
 1998: Laurien Ntezimana and Modeste Mungwarareba, Rwanda
 1999: Clonard Fitzroy Fellowship, Northern Ireland
 2000: Ann Pettifor and Laura Vargas (Jubilee 2000), UK and Peru
 2001: Eddie Kneebone and Teesta Setavaid, Australia
 2002: Roberto Layson, Philippines
 2003: Franjo Starcevic, Croatia
 2004: Sérgio Vieira de Mello, Brazil
 2005: Jacques Delors, France
 2006: Ogarit Younan and Rami George Khouri, Lebanon, Palestine/Jordan
 2007: Women's Active Museum on War and Peace, Japan
 2008: Luiz Flávio Cappio, Brazil
 2009: Justine Masika Bihamba, Democratic Republic of the Congo
 2010: Louis Raphaël I Sako, Iraq
 2011: Pontanima, Bosnia and Herzegovina
 2012: John Onaiyekan, Nigeria
 2013: Memorial, Russia
 2014: Jesuit Refugee Service, Syria
 2015: Women, Peace and Security Collective for Reflection and Action, Colombia
 2016: Catholic Commission for Justice and Peace of Pakistan and Human Rights Commission of Pakistan, Pakistan
 2017: ZODEVITE, Mexico
 2018: No Boundaries Coalition, USA
 2019: European Lawyers in Lesvos (ELIL), Greece
 2020: Pacific Climate Warriors
 2021: Catholic Radio Network for South Sudan and Nuba Mountains, South Sudan

See also 

 Pope Paul VI Teacher of Peace Award
 Catholic peace traditions

References

External links 
 

Peace awards
Christian nonviolence